Hermann is a small lunar impact crater that is located in the western Oceanus Procellarum, just over one crater diameter to the south of the Moon's equator. It is a solitary crater with only a few tiny craterlets and some low wrinkle ridges nearby.

The interior floor of this crater has been flooded with lava, leaving a dark surface with the same albedo as the surrounding lunar mare. Only a low, nearly circular rim projects above the surface, which is not significantly eroded. The rim has a slight outward bulge on the western rim.

Satellite craters
By convention these features are identified on lunar maps by placing the letter on the side of the crater midpoint that is closest to Hermann.

References

 
 
 
 
 
 
 
 
 
 
 
 

Impact craters on the Moon